Hanna Faulhaber (born September 4, 2004) is an Olympic American freestyle skier who competes internationally.

Career
She competed in the FIS Freestyle Ski and Snowboarding World Championships 2021, where she placed fourth in women's ski halfpipe.

Hanna is a 2019 National Champion. She competed on the 2020 United States Youth Olympic Team, earning a bronze medal. In 2022, she competed in her first Olympic Games, placing 6th in Freeski Halfpipe.

Personal 
Faulhaber has been skiing since she was three years old. She joined Aspen Valley Ski and Snowboard Club when she was four and kept progressing program by program.

She has been traveling the world as a professional halfpipe skier. She used to watch X Games in her hometown and got inspired to ski the Halfpipe.

References

2004 births
Living people
American female freestyle skiers
Freestyle skiers at the 2022 Winter Olympics
Olympic freestyle skiers of the United States
Freestyle skiers at the 2020 Winter Youth Olympics
Youth Olympic bronze medalists for the United States
21st-century American women
X Games athletes